An exploitation film is a film that tries to succeed financially by exploiting current trends, niche genres, or lurid content. Exploitation films are generally low-quality "B movies", though some set trends, attract critical attention, become historically important, and even gain a cult following.

History
Exploitation films may feature suggestive or explicit sex, sensational violence, drug use, nudity, gore, destruction, rebellion, mayhem, and the bizarre. Such films were first seen in their modern form in the early 1920s, but they were popularized in the 60s and 70s with the general relaxing of censorship and cinematic taboos in the U.S. and Europe. An early example, the 1933 film Ecstasy, included nude scenes featuring the Austrian actress Hedy Lamarr. The film proved popular at the box office but caused concern for the American cinema trade association, the MPPDA. The organisation, which applied the The Hays Code for film censorship, also disapproved of the work of Dwain Esper, the director responsible for exploitation movies such as Marihuana (1936) and Maniac (1934). 

The Motion Picture Association of America (and the Motion Picture Producers and Distributors of America before it) cooperated with censorship boards and grassroots organizations in the hope of preserving the image of a "clean" Hollywood, but the distributors of exploitation film operated outside of this circuit and often welcomed controversy as a form of free promotion. Their producers used sensational elements to attract audiences lost to television. Since the 1990s, this genre has also received attention in academic circles, where it is sometimes called paracinema.

"Exploitation" is loosely defined and arguably has as much to do with the viewer's perception of the film as with the film's actual content. Titillating material and artistic content often coexist, as demonstrated by the fact that art films that failed to pass the Hays Code were often shown in the same grindhouses as exploitation films. Exploitation films share the fearlessness of acclaimed transgressive European directors such as Derek Jarman, Luis Buñuel, and Jean-Luc Godard in handling "disreputable" content. Many films recognized as classics contain levels of sex, violence, and shock typically associated with exploitation films, such as Stanley Kubrick's A Clockwork Orange. The novel on which it was based, written by Anthony Burgess, is most well-known and memorable for its themes of youth and counterculture. The Stanley Kubrick movie from 1971 includes the famous iconic scene when Alex is strapped to a chair with his eyes forced open, and is forced to watch horrifying footage of the holocaust and World War II. Author Anthony Burgess defined that moment as the Ludovico treatment. It was a neurological intervention that used behavioral conditioning and psychopharmacology to prevent the subject from committing violent crimes.  "A Clockwork Orange" speaks to the audience of the dominant culture and counterculture.  The novel and movie delve into the neuroscience and cultural effects of War World II, reflecting reactionary politics of fear based on disciplinary neuroscience.   Tod Browning's Freaks, and Roman Polanski's Repulsion. Buñuel's Un Chien Andalou contains elements of the modern splatter film. It has been suggested that if Carnival of Souls had been made in Europe, it would be considered an art film, while if Eyes Without a Face had been made in the U.S., it would have been categorized as a low-budget horror film. The audiences of art and exploitation film are both considered to have tastes that reject the mainstream Hollywood offerings.

Exploitation films have often exploited news events in the short-term public consciousness that a major film studio may avoid because of the time required to produce a major film. Child Bride (1938), for example, tackled the issue of older men marrying young girls in the Ozarks. Other issues, such as drug use in films like Reefer Madness (1936), attracted audiences that major film studios would usually avoid in order to keep their respectable, mainstream reputations. With enough incentive, however, major studios might become involved, as Warner Bros. did in their 1969 anti-LSD, anti-counterculture film The Big Cube. The film Sex Madness (1938) portrayed the dangers of venereal disease from premarital sex. Mom and Dad, a 1945 film about pregnancy and childbirth, was promoted in lurid terms. She Shoulda Said No! (1949) combined the themes of drug use and promiscuous sex. In the early days of film, when exploitation films relied on such sensational subjects as these, they had to present a very conservative moral viewpoint to avoid censorship, as movies then were not considered to enjoy First Amendment protection.

Several war films were made about the Winter War in Finland, the Korean War, and the Vietnam War before the major studios showed interest. When Orson Welles' radio production of The War of the Worlds from The Mercury Theatre on the Air for Halloween in 1938 shocked many Americans and made news, Universal Pictures edited their serial Flash Gordon's Trip to Mars into a short feature called Mars Attacks the World for release in November of that year.

Some Poverty Row low-budget B movies often exploit major studio projects. Their rapid production schedule allows them to take advantage of publicity attached to major studio films. For example, Edward L. Alperson produced William Cameron Menzies' film Invaders from Mars to beat Paramount Pictures' production of director George Pal's The War of the Worlds to the cinemas, and Pal's The Time Machine was beaten to the cinemas by Edgar G. Ulmer's film Beyond the Time Barrier. As a result, many major studios, producers, and stars keep their projects secret.

Grindhouses and drive-ins 

Grindhouse is an American term for a theater that mainly showed exploitation films.  These theatres were popular throughout the 1960s, 1970s and early 1980s in New York City and other urban centers, mainly in North America, but began a long decline during the mid 1980s with the advent of home video.

As the drive-in movie theater began to decline in the 1960s and 1970s, theater owners began to look for ways to bring in patrons. One solution was to book lower cost exploitation films. Some producers from the 1950s to the 1980s made films directly for the drive-in market, and the commodity product needed for a weekly change led to another theory about the origin of the word: that the producers would "grind"-out films. Many of them were violent action films that some called "drive-in" films.

Subgenres 
Exploitation films may adopt the subject matter and styling of regular film genres, particularly horror films and documentary films, and their themes are sometimes influenced by other so-called exploitative media, such as pulp magazines. They often blur the distinctions between genres by containing elements of two or more genres at a time. Their subgenres are identifiable by the characteristics they use. For example, Doris Wishman's Let Me Die A Woman contains elements of both shock documentary and sexploitation.

1930s and 1940s cautionary films 

Although they featured lurid subject matter, exploitation films of the 1930s and 1940s evaded the strict censorship and scrutiny of the era by claiming to be educational. They were generally cautionary tales about the alleged dangers of premarital sexual intercourse and the use of recreational drugs. Examples include Marihuana (1936), Reefer Madness (1936), Sex Madness (1938), Child Bride (1938), Mom and Dad (1945), and She Shoulda Said No! (1949). An exploitation film about homosexuality, Children of Loneliness (1937), is now believed lost.

Biker films 

In 1953 The Wild One, starring Marlon Brando, was the first film about a motorcycle gang. A string of low-budget juvenile delinquent films featuring hot-rods and motorcycles followed in the 1950s. The success of American International Pictures' The Wild Angels in 1966 ignited a more robust trend that continued into the early 1970s. Other biker films include Motorpsycho (1965), Hells Angels on Wheels (1967), The Born Losers (1967), Angels from Hell (1968), Easy Rider (1969), Satan's Sadists (1969), Naked Angels (1969), The Sidehackers (1969), Nam's Angels (1970), and C.C. and Company (1970). Stone (1974), Mad Max (1979), and 1% (2017) combine elements of this subgenre with Ozploitation. In the 1960s Roger Corman directed Edgar Allan Poe B horror movies with well-known horror veteran movie actors with Boris Karloff, Peter Lorre, Vincent Price, and a very young and unknown Jack Nicholson. He turned down directing Easy Rider which was directed by Dennis Hopper.

Blaxploitation 

Black exploitation films, or "blaxploitation" films, are made with black actors, ostensibly for black audiences, often in a stereotypically black American urban milieu. A prominent theme was black Americans overcoming hostile authority ("The Man") through cunning and violence. The first examples of this subgenre were Shaft and Melvin Van Peebles' Sweet Sweetback's Baadasssss Song. Others are Black Caesar, Black Devil Doll, Blacula, Black Shampoo, Boss Nigger, Coffy, Coonskin, Cotton Comes to Harlem, Dolemite, Foxy Brown, Hell Up in Harlem, The Mack, Disco Godfather, Mandingo, The Spook Who Sat by the Door, Sugar Hill, Super Fly, T.N.T. Jackson, The Thing with Two Heads, Truck Turner, Willie Dynamite and Cleopatra Jones.

In Blaxploitation horror movies back in the 1970’s, despite the leading stars in those movies being black, some of these movies were either produced, edited, or directed by white filmmakers.  Blackula, a well-known Blaxploitation horror movie, was directed by an African American filmmaker named William Crain.  Blackula was one of the first early successful blaxploitation horror movies.  Ganja and Hess stars Duane Jones who played Ben in Night of the Living Dead.  This movie has political and social commentary. The Vampires are a metaphor for capitalism according to Harry M. Benshoff.

Modern homages of this genre include Jackie Brown, Pootie Tang, Undercover Brother, Black Dynamite, Proud Mary and BlacKkKlansman. The 1973 Bond film Live and Let Die uses blaxploitation themes.

Cannibal films 

Cannibal films are graphic movies from the early 1970s to the late 1980s, primarily made by Italian and Spanish moviemakers. They focus on cannibalism by tribes deep in the South American or Asian rainforests. This cannibalism is usually perpetrated against Westerners that the tribes held prisoner. As with mondo films, the main draw of cannibal films was the promise of exotic locales and graphic gore involving living creatures. The best-known film of this genre is the controversial 1980 Cannibal Holocaust, in which six real animals were killed on screen. Others include Cannibal Ferox, Eaten Alive!, Cannibal Women in the Avocado Jungle of Death, The Mountain of the Cannibal God, Last Cannibal World, and the first film of the genre, The Man From Deep River. Famous directors in this genre include Umberto Lenzi, Ruggero Deodato, Jesús Franco, and Joe D'Amato.

The Green Inferno (2013) is a modern homage to the genre.

Canuxploitation 
"Canuxploitation" is a neologism that was coined in 1999 by the magazine Broken Pencil, in the article "Canuxploitation! Goin' Down the Road with the Cannibal Girls that Ate Black Christmas. Your Complete Guide to the Canadian B-Movie", to refer to Canadian-made B-movies. Most mainstream critical analysis of this period in Canadian film history, however, refers to it as the "tax-shelter era".

The phenomenon emerged in 1974, when the government of Canada introduced new regulations to jumpstart the then-underdeveloped Canadian film industry, increasing the Capital Cost Allowance tax credit from 60 per cent to 100 per cent. While some important and noteworthy films were made under the program, including The Apprenticeship of Duddy Kravitz and Lies My Father Told Me, and some film directors who cut their teeth in the "tax shelter" era emerged as among Canada's most important and influential filmmakers of the era, including David Cronenberg, William Fruet, Ivan Reitman and Bob Clark, the new regulations also had an entirely unforeseen side effect: a sudden rush of low-budget horror and genre films, intended as pure tax shelters since they were designed not to turn a conventional profit. Many of the films, in fact, were made by American filmmakers whose projects had been rejected by the Hollywood studio system as not commercially viable, giving rise to the Hollywood North phenomenon.

Notable examples of the genre include Cannibal Girls, Deathdream, Deranged, The Corpse Eaters, Black Christmas, Shivers, Death Weekend, The Clown Murders, Rituals, Cathy's Curse, Deadly Harvest, Starship Invasions, Rabid, I Miss You, Hugs and Kisses, The Brood, Funeral Home, Terror Train, The Changeling, Death Ship, My Bloody Valentine, Prom Night, Happy Birthday to Me, Scanners, Ghostkeeper, Visiting Hours, Highpoint, Humongous, Deadly Eyes, Class of 1984, Videodrome, Curtains, American Nightmare, Self Defense, Spasms, and Def-Con 4.

The period officially ended in 1982, when the Capital Cost Allowance was reduced to 50 per cent, although films that had entered production under the program continued to be released for another few years afterward. However, at least one Canadian film blog extends the "Canuxploitation" term to refer to any Canadian horror, thriller or science fiction film made up to the present day.

Carsploitation 
Carsploitation films feature scenes of cars racing and crashing, featuring the sports cars, muscle cars, and car wrecks that were popular in the 1970s and 1980s. They were produced mainly in the United States and Australia. The quintessential film of this genre is Vanishing Point (1971). Others include Two-Lane Blacktop (1971), The Cars That Ate Paris (1974), Dirty Mary, Crazy Larry (1974), Gone in 60 Seconds (1974), Death Race 2000 (1975), Race with the Devil (1975), Cannonball (1976), Mad Max (1979), Safari 3000 (1982), Dead End Drive-In (1986) and Black Moon Rising (1986). Quentin Tarantino directed a tribute to the genre, Death Proof (2007).

Chambara films 

In the 1970s, a revisionist, non-traditional style of samurai film achieved some popularity in Japan. It became known as chambara, an onomatopoeia describing the clash of swords. Its origins can be traced as far back as Akira Kurosawa, whose films feature moral grayness and exaggerated violence, but the genre is mostly associated with 1970s samurai manga by Kazuo Koike, on whose work many later films would be based. Chambara features few of the stoic, formal sensibilities of earlier jidaigeki films – the new chambara featured revenge-driven antihero protagonists, nudity, sex scenes, swordplay, and blood.

Giallo films 

Giallo films are Italian-made slasher films that focus on cruel murders and the subsequent search for the killers. They are named for the Italian word for yellow, giallo, the background color featured on the covers of the pulp novels by which these movies were inspired. The progenitor of this genre was The Girl Who Knew Too Much. Other examples of Giallo films include Four Flies on Grey Velvet, Deep Red, The Cat o' Nine Tails, The Bird with the Crystal Plumage, The Case of the Scorpion's Tail, A Lizard in a Woman's Skin, Black Belly of the Tarantula, The Strange Vice of Mrs. Wardh, Blood and Black Lace, Phenomena, Opera and Tenebrae. Dario Argento, Lucio Fulci, and Mario Bava are the best-known directors of this genre.

The 2013 Argentinian film Sonno Profondo is a modern tribute to the genre.

Mockbusters 

Mockbusters, sometimes called "remakesploitation films", are copycat movies that try to cash in on the advertising of heavily promoted films from major studios. Production company the Asylum, which prefers to call them "tie-ins", is a prominent producer of these films. Such films have often come from Italy, which has been quick to latch on to trends like Westerns, James Bond movies, and zombie films. They have long been a staple of directors such as Jim Wynorski (The Bare Wench Project, and the Cliffhanger imitation Sub Zero), who make movies for the direct-to-video market. Such films are beginning to attract attention from major Hollywood studios, who served the Asylum with a cease and desist order to try to prevent them from releasing The Day the Earth Stopped to video stores in advance of the release of The Day the Earth Stood Still to theaters.

The term mockbuster was used as early as the 1950s (when The Monster of Piedras Blancas was a clear derivative of Creature From The Black Lagoon). The term did not become popular until the 1970s, with Starcrash and the Turkish Dünyayı Kurtaran Adam and Süpermen dönüyor. The latter two used scenes from Star Wars and unauthorized excerpts from John Williams' score.

Mondo films 

Mondo films, often called shockumentaries, are quasi-documentary films about sensationalized topics like exotic customs from around the world or gruesome death footage. The goal of mondo films, as of shock exploitation, is to shock the audience by dealing with taboo subject matter. The first mondo film is Mondo Cane (A Dog's World). Others include Shocking Asia, Africa Addio (aka Africa Blood and Guts and Farewell Africa), Goodbye Uncle Tom, and Faces of Death.

Monster movies 

These "nature-run-amok" films focus on an animal or group of animals, far larger and more aggressive than usual for their species, terrorizing humans while another group of humans tries to fight back. This genre began in the 1950s, when concern over nuclear weapons testing made movies about giant monsters popular. These were typically either giant prehistoric creatures awakened by atomic explosions or ordinary animals mutated by radiation. Among them were Godzilla, Them!, and Tarantula. The trend was revived in the 1970s as awareness of pollution increased and corporate greed and military irresponsibility were blamed for destruction of the environment. Night of the Lepus, Frogs, and Godzilla vs. Hedorah are examples. After Steven Spielberg's 1975 film Jaws, a number of very similar films (sometimes regarded as outright rip-offs) were produced in the hope of cashing in on its success. Examples are Alligator, Cujo, Day of the Animals, Great White, Grizzly, Humanoids from the Deep, Monster Shark, Orca, The Pack, Piranha, Prophecy, Razorback, Blood Feast, Tentacles, and Tintorera. Roger Corman was a major producer of these films in both decades. The genre has experienced a revival in recent years, as films like Mulberry Street and Larry Fessenden's The Last Winter reflected concerns about global warming and overpopulation.

The Sci-Fi Channel (now known as SyFy) has produced several films about giant or hybrid mutations whose titles are sensationalized portmanteaus of the two species; examples include Sharktopus and Dinoshark.

Nazisploitation 

Nazi exploitation films, also called "Nazisploitation" films, or "il sadiconazista", focus on Nazis torturing prisoners in death camps and brothels during World War II. The tortures are often sexual, and the prisoners, who are often female, are nude. The progenitor of this subgenre was Love Camp 7 (1969). The archetype of the genre, which established its popularity and its typical themes, was Ilsa, She Wolf of the SS (1974), about the buxom, nymphomaniacal dominatrix Ilsa torturing prisoners in a Stalag. Others include Fräulein Devil (Captive Women 4, or Elsa: Fraulein SS, or Fraulein Kitty), La Bestia in calore (SS Hell Camp, or SS Experiment Part 2, or The Beast in Heat, or Horrifying Experiments of the S.S. Last Days), Gestapo's Last Orgy, or Last Orgy of The Third Reich, or Caligula Reincarnated as Hitler), Salon Kitty and SS Experiment Camp. Many Nazisploitation films were influenced by art films such as Pier Paolo Pasolini's infamous Salò, or the 120 Days of Sodom and Liliana Cavani's  (The Night Porter) .

Inglourious Basterds (2009) and The Devil's Rock (2011) are modern homages to the subgenre.

Nudist films 

Nudist films originated in the 1930s as films that skirted the Hays Code restrictions on nudity by purportedly depicting the naturist lifestyle. They existed through the late 1950s, when the New York State Court of Appeals ruled in the case of Excelsior Pictures vs. New York Board of Regents that onscreen nudity is not obscene. This opened the door to more open depictions of nudity, starting with Russ Meyer's 1959 The Immoral Mr. Teas, which has been credited as the first film to place its exploitation elements unapologetically at the forefront instead of pretending to carry a moral or educational message. This development paved the way for the more explicit exploitation films of the 1960s and 1970s and made the nudist genre obsolete—ironically, since the nudist film Garden of Eden was the subject of the court case. After this, the nudist genre split into subgenres such as the "nudie-cutie", which featured nudity but no touching, and the "roughie", which included nudity and violent, antisocial behavior.

Nudist films were marked by self-contradictory qualities. They presented themselves as educational films, but exploited their subject matter by focusing mainly on the nudist camps' most beautiful female residents, while denying the existence of such exploitation. They depicted a lifestyle unbound by the restrictions of clothing, yet this depiction was restricted by the requirement that genitals should not be shown. Still, there was a subversive element to them, as the nudist camps inherently rejected modern society and its values regarding the human body. These films frequently involve a criticism of the class system, equating body shame with the upper class, and nudism with social equality. One scene in The Unashamed makes a point about the artificiality of clothing and its related values through a mocking portrayal of a group of nude artists who paint fully clothed subjects.

Ozploitation 

The term "Ozploitation" refers broadly to Australian horror, erotic or crime films of the 1970s and 1980s. Changes to Australia's film classification system in 1971 led to the production of a number of such low-budget, privately funded films, assisted by tax exemptions and targeting export markets. Often an internationally recognised actor (but of waning notability) would be hired to play a lead role. Laconic characters and desert scenes feature in many Ozploitation films, but the term has been used for a variety of Australian films of the era that relied on shocking or titillating their audiences. A documentary about the genre was Not Quite Hollywood: The Wild, Untold Story of Ozploitation!. Such films deal with themes concerning Australian society, particularly in respect of masculinity (especially the ocker male), male attitudes towards women, attitudes towards and treatment of Indigenous Australians, violence, alcohol, and environmental exploitation and destruction. The films typically have rural or outback settings, depicting the Australian landscape and environment as an almost spiritually malign force that alienates white Australians, frustrating their personal ambitions and activities, and their attempts to subdue it.

Notable examples include Mad Max, Alvin Purple, Patrick and Turkey Shoot.

Rape and revenge films 

This genre contains films in which a person is raped, left for dead, recovers and then exacts a graphic, gory revenge against the rapists. The most famous example is I Spit on Your Grave (also called Day of the Woman). It is not unusual for the main character in these films to be a successful, independent city woman, who is attacked by a man from the country. The genre has drawn praise from feminists such as Carol J. Clover, whose 1992 book Men, Women, and Chainsaws: Gender in the Modern Horror Film examines the implications of its reversals of cinema's traditional gender roles. This type of film can be seen as an offshoot of the vigilante film, with the victim's transformation into avenger as the key scene. Author Jacinda Read and others believe that rape–revenge should be categorized as a narrative structure rather than a true subgenre, because its plot can be found in films of many different genres, such as thrillers (Ms. 45), dramas (Lipstick), westerns (Hannie Caulder), and art films (Memento). One instance of the genre, the original version of The Last House on the Left, was an uncredited remake of Ingmar Bergman's The Virgin Spring, recast as a horror film featuring extreme violence. Deliverance, in which the rape is perpetrated on a man, has been credited as the originator of the genre. Clover, who restricts her definition of the genre to movies in which a woman is raped and gains her own revenge, praises rape–revenge exploitation films for the way in which their protagonists fight their abuse directly, rather than preserve the status quo by depending on an unresponsive legal system as in rape–revenge movies from major studios, such as The Accused.

Redsploitation 

The redsploitation genre concerns Native American characters almost always played by white actors, usually exacting their revenge on their white tormentors. Examples are Billy Jack tetralogy, The Ransom, the Thunder Warrior trilogy, Johnny Firecloud, Angry Joe Bass, The Manitou, Prophecy, Avenged (aka Savaged), Scalps and Clearcut.

Sexploitation 

Sexploitation films resemble softcore pornography and often include scenes involving nude or semi-nude women. They typically have sex scenes that are more graphic sex than mainstream films. The plots of sexploitation films include pulp fiction elements such as killers, slavery, fem-dom, martial-arts, the use  of stylistic devices and dialogue associated with screwball comedies, love interests and flirtation akin to romance films, over-the-top direction, cheeky homages, fan-pleasing content and caricatures, and performances that contain sleazy teasing alluding to foreplay or kink. The use of extended scenes and the showing of full frontal nudity are typical genre techniques. Sexploitation films include Faster, Pussycat! Kill! Kill! and Supervixens by Russ Meyer, the work of Armando Bó with Isabel Sarli, the Emmanuelle series, Showgirls, and Caligula. Caligula is unusual among exploitation films in that it was made with a large budget and well known actors (Malcolm McDowell, John Gielgud, Peter O'Toole, and Helen Mirren).

In the 1970’s Lesbian Erotic Sex was questioned on the political social implications of lesbianism about women's sexuality.  To this day it's still a concern of feminist film criticism.  Some critics have pointed out lesbians on screen sex are a clear expression of chauvinism and male power as the images are portrayed for male pleasure. 

Casting pornstars and hardcore actresses is not uncommon. Sexploitation films may contain sex shows intended to shock or tantalize their audiences.

Slasher films 

Slasher films focus on a psychopath stalking and violently killing a sequence of victims. Victims are often teenagers or young adults. Alfred Hitchcock's Psycho (1960) is often credited with creating the basic premise of the genre, though Bob Clark's Black Christmas (1974) is usually considered to have started the genre while John Carpenter's Halloween (1978) was responsible for cementing the genre in the public eye. Halloween is also responsible for establishing additional tropes which would go on to define the genre in years to come. The masked villain, a central group of weak teenagers with one strong hero or heroine, the protagonists being isolated or stranded in precarious locations or situations, and either the protagonists or antagonists (or possibly both) experiencing warped family lives or values were all tropes largely founded in Halloween.

Black Christmas was the first Canadian movie to break the American market.   It was the only film being shot in Canada at the time.  It was also their final opportunity to produce their first blockbuster hit. The film was marketed for women and teenage girls.  It’s debatable that MPAA-members became less interested in targeting female audiences compared to previous decades.  The subplot of the character Jess played by Olivia Hussey wanting an abortion may have struck a chord for American women since abortion was a hotbed issue.  Black Christmas was a success in Canada but was not a hit in the USA.  In later years the film became and developed into a cult classic.  Halloween’s success overshadowed Black Christmas.  Halloween is misunderstood as the first slasher movie which is not true.  John Carpenter was inspired by Bob Clark’s Black Christmas..

The genre continued into and peaked in the 1980s with well-known films like Friday the 13th (1980) and A Nightmare on Elm Street (1984). Many 1980s slasher films used the basic format of Halloween, for example My Bloody Valentine (1981), Prom Night (1980), The Funhouse (1981), Silent Night, Deadly Night (1984) and Sleepaway Camp (1983), many of which also used elements from the 1974 film, Black Christmas.

Spacesploitation 
A subtype featuring space, science fiction and horror in film. Despite ambitious literary works that depicted space travel as a component of more complex plots set in elaborately constructed civilizations (such as the Frank Herbert’s Dune series and the works of Isaac Asimov), for much of the 20th century space travel has been mostly featured in cheap “B films” that often had in their core a simplistic plot typical of another exploitation subgenre, such as slasher or zombie films. Spacesploration films feature a scientifically inaccurate and inconsistent depiction of space travel and are usually set in traversing spaceships and deserted planets, partially due to the films’ limited resources. Such films include From the Earth to the Moon, Robinson Crusoe on Mars, Planet of the Vampires, The Black Hole and Saturn 3. During one of the peaks of space travel films, the 1979 James Bond film Moonraker featured outlandishly unrealistic scenes of space warfare, despite otherwise focusing on real contemporary (i.e. Cold War) intelligence agencies.

Spaghetti Westerns 

Spaghetti Westerns are Italian-made westerns that emerged in the mid-1960s. They were more violent and amoral than typical Hollywood westerns. These films also often eschewed the conventions of Hollywood studio Westerns, which were primarily for consumption by conservative, mainstream American audiences.

Examples of the genre include Death Rides a Horse; Django; The Good, the Bad and the Ugly; Navajo Joe; The Grand Duel; The Great Silence; For a Few Dollars More; The Big Gundown; Day of Anger; Face to Face; Duck, You Sucker!; A Fistful of Dollars and Once Upon a Time in the West. Quentin Tarantino directed two tributes to the genre, Django Unchained, and The Hateful Eight.

Splatter films 

A splatter film, or gore film, is a horror film that focuses on graphic portrayals of gore and violence. It began as a distinct genre in the 1960s with the films of Herschell Gordon Lewis and David F. Friedman, whose most famous films include Blood Feast (1963), Two Thousand Maniacs! (1964), Color Me Blood Red (1965), The Gruesome Twosome (1967) and The Wizard of Gore (1970).

The first splatter film to popularize the subgenre was George A. Romero's Night of the Living Dead (1968), the director's attempt to replicate the atmosphere and gore of EC's horror comics on film. Initially derided by the American press as "appalling", it quickly became a national sensation, playing not just in drive-ins but at midnight showings in indoor theaters across the country.  George A. Romero coined the term "splatter cinema" to describe his film Dawn of the Dead.

Later splatter films, such as Sam Raimi's Evil Dead series, Peter Jackson's Bad Taste and Braindead (released as Dead Alive in North America) featured such excessive and unrealistic gore that they crossed the line from horror to comedy.

Women in prison films 

Women in prison films emerged in the early 1970s and remain a popular subgenre. They usually contain nudity, lesbianism, sexual assault, humiliation, sadism, and rebellion among captive women. Examples are Ted V. Mikel's "10 Violent Women", Roger Corman's Women in Cages and The Big Doll House, Bamboo House of Dolls, Jesus Franco's Barbed Wire Dolls, Bruno Mattei's Women's Prison Massacre, Pete Walker's House of Whipcord, Tom DeSimone's Reform School Girls, Jonathan Demme's Caged Heat and Katja von Garnier's Bandits.

Zombie films 

White Zombie was considered the first movie to use the word Zombie.  It’s not a flesh-eating zombie movie but about mind controlling slaves. The film was inspired from Haitian culture where voodoo is one of the religions.  Revolt of the Zombie from 1936 is a sequel but was not a hit like White Zombie.  In 1936, another Zombie film, The Walking Dead is not about flesh eating but is a crime drama.

Small independent film studios made zombie movies taking risk.

Producer Val Lewton, fresh off his success with Cat People (1942), filmed his next movie I Walked with a Zombie (1943). It was another Zombie movie not about flesh eating.  The plot concerns a man whose wife is a sleepwalker, and she can’t wake up.  Zombies on Broadway (1945) failed and Get Along Little Zombie was made for laughs and not taken seriously.  

War World II ended, and the economy had recovered from the depression and the war.  Drive-in movie theaters were popular for families having a fun experience.  Zombie movies were not taken seriously, they were made for teenagers.  Teenage zombie movies were made on a small budget and were made rapidly.  These movies today are looked upon as metaphors for the early stages of the Cold War. People were afraid of being infiltrated and nuked by the Russians.

Creature with the Atom Brain (1955) was directed by Edward L. Cahn and reflects on early influence of atomic bomb anxiety on sci-fi horror flicks.  Because of the booming economy, teenagers had money saved from their allowance or got part time jobs to go to the movies with friends or borrow their parents car to take their girlfriend to the movies.

1957 Hammer British studios released The Quatermass 2

Plan 9 From Outer Space is one of the worst movies ever made.  It was horror icon Bela Lugosi's last movie; he died during production of the movie.   

1960s

The 1960’s independent horror movies were beginning to change the horror industry.  It attracted a lot of young teenage audiences at the time.  Teenagers changed but so did Zombie movies.  Classic horror monsters from the past were no longer considered scary.  Zombies' movies became psychedelic, weirder, and goofy.  By the end of the decade Night of the Living Dead was groundbreaking and changing the Zombie Subgenre.

George Romero's Night of the Living Dead (1968) is considered to be the first ever flesh-eating Zombie movie.  Despite the title they are not referred to as Zombies.  Social commentary on racism and Vietnam was going on at the time of the movie's release.  This was appealing to audiences at the time of its release.  Because many people were opposed to the Vietnam War.  George Romero was inspired from Richard Matheson 1954 novel I Am Legend.  Romero’s movie was a very graphic, gross-out movie for its time.  

George Romero makes sequels to his Night of the Living with Dawn of the Dead and Day of the Dead.

By the turn of the 21st Century, Zombie movies became popular from being inspired by George Romero’s Night of the Living Dead.  28 Days Later and the Dawn of the Dead remake were about incurable diseases.  

2010 The Walking Dead TV Show was popular Zombie TV show in AMC.

Minor subgenres 
 Actionploitation: Parody of 70s and 80s action films, usually a high-octane power fantasy that features macho pride, low-brow humor, cringe humor, bumbling and screwball buddy cops, martial-arts, western boxing or street fighting, exaggerated rapport and/or bonding between villain and protagonist, intermittent melodrama and romance, plot elements that may be dropped and picked up again at random times to emphasize protagonist or villain's brilliant planning and concludes with a drawn out final fight sequence. Films such as  Megaforce, Full Contact, Crank, Samurai Cop 2 and Kung Fury is restoring actionsploitation to the small screen and big screen.
 Britsploitation: exploitation films set in Great Britain, sometimes in homage to the Hammer Horror range of films. Examples are The Living Dead at Manchester Morgue (1974) and the Academy Award winning American film An American Werewolf in London (1981).
 Bruceploitation: films profiting from the death of Bruce Lee, with look-alike actors who often took similar names, like Bruce Li and Bruce Le. Examples include Enter Three Dragons and Re-Enter the Dragon. Another example is New Fist of Fury, which starred Jackie Chan before he became known for his "slapstick" fighting style.
 Category III films: Hong Kongese films aimed at audiences 18 years or older, named after the age certificates they would receive in Hong Kong. These films are estimated to make up 25% of Hong Kong's film industry, and as in exploitation film itself, every genre of filmmaking is represented. Films made in the west, such as Wild Things and Eyes Wide Shut, often receive the Category III rating. Category III films are grouped into three classes based on censorship criteria: "quasi-pornographic" softcore pornography such as Sex and Zen, "genre films" that present adult-oriented versions of every genre of Hong Kong filmmaking, and "pornoviolence" films such as The Untold Story, which depict sexual violence and are often based on actual police cases.
 Chopsocky: Martial arts kung fu movies made primarily in Hong Kong and Taiwan during the 1960s and 1970s, such as Hand of Death, Master of the Flying Guillotine, Five Deadly Venoms and Legend of Shaolin Temple.
 Christploitation: Exploitation films with overtly Christian themes. Whereas films such as The Passion of Joan of Arc and The Gospel According to St. Matthew are serious, thoughtful examinations of faith and spirituality, the Christploitation film delivers through condescension and heavy-handed delivery, the purpose of which is to make the non-Christian viewer feel guilty for not converting to Christianity. Christploitation films have existed for many decades, but only recently have achieved wider viewership. Independently produced mormon-themed films All Faces West (1930) and  Corianton (1931) were exploited for their expected appeal to LDS patrons. An early American example, The Lawton Story (1949) (aka Prince of Piece) was given an exploitation release by its producer Kroger Babb. Modern examples include God's Not Dead, the Nicolas Cage remake of Left Behind, Unplanned, and Last Ounce of Courage.
 Deepsploitation: Between 1989 and 1990, numerous films with similar plots were released. All films show an underwater crew that has to fight with sea monsters in the deep ocean. Deep Star Six, Leviathan, The Abyss, The Evil Below and Lords of the Deep were released in 1989, and The Rift was released in 1990.  While most of these films are low-budget, some are big productions, like The Abyss.
 Gothsploitation: A small number of films generally from the year 2000 onwards featuring members of the Alternative or Goth subcultures of the UK, usually London, such as Learning Hebrew: A Gothsploitation Movie showing situations such as drug use, unusual sexual practises and wild parties, often with a heavily intellectual plot.
Hicksploitation: an exploitation film subgenre based on stereotypes of the people and culture of the Southern United States. Examples of this subgenre include Child Bride, Deliverance, Two Thousand Maniacs!, and The Texas Chainsaw Massacre.
 Hippie exploitation: 1960s films about the hippie counterculture, showing stereotypical situations such as marijuana and LSD use, sex, and wild psychedelic parties. Further examples are The Love-Ins, Psych-Out, The Trip (1967), and Wild in the Streets.
 Martial arts films: action films or historical dramas that are characterized by extensive fighting scenes employing martial arts. The genre was originally associated with Asia but gained international popularity owing to Bruce Lee. Examples include The Street Fighter and Sister Street Fighter series, and the Bruce Lee films The Big Boss, Fist of Fury, Way of the Dragon, and Enter the Dragon.
 Mexican sex comedies film genre: the Mexican sex comedies film genre, generally known as ficheras film, is a genre of sexploitation films that were produced and distributed in Mexico between the middle 1970s and the late 1980s. They were characterized by the language game called "albures" (comparable to "playing the dozens" in English), and their sexual tone was considered "risque," though they weren't always particularly explicit.
 Mexploitation: films exaggerating Mexican culture and portrayals of Mexican underworld, often dealing with crime, drug trafficking, money and sex. Hugo Stiglitz is a famous Mexican actor of this genre, as are Mario and Fernando Almada, brothers who made hundreds of movies on the same theme.
 Ninja films: these are a subgenre of martial arts films that center on the historically inaccurate stereotype of the ninja's costume and arsenal of weapons, often including fantasy elements such as ninja magic. Many such movies were produced by splicing stock ninja fight footage with footage from unrelated film projects.
 Nunsploitation: films featuring nuns in dangerous or erotic situations, such as The Devils, Killer Nun, School of the Holy Beast, The Sinful Nuns of Saint Valentine, and Nude Nuns with Big Guns.
 Pinku eiga (pink films): Japanese sexploitation films popular throughout the 70s, often featuring softcore sex, rape, torture, BDSM and other unconventional sexual subjects.
 Pornochanchada: Brazilian naïve softcore pornographic films produced mostly in the 1970s.
 Rumberas film: Musical film genre that flourished in the called Golden Age of Mexican cinema in the 1940s and 1950s, and whose plots were developed mainly in tropical environments and the cabaret. His main stars were the actresses and dancers known as "Rumberas" (Afro-Caribbean rhythms dancers).
 Sharksploitation films: a subgenre about sharks. The most popular film in this genre is Jaws, and the subsequent Jaws (franchise) but many other films have been released. The sharksploitation films Sharknado, The Shallows, Bait 3D, The Reef, Shark Night, The Meg, Mega Shark Versus Crocosaurus and its sequels, Deep Blue Sea, & Open Water are all examples of recent films in this genre. Sharksploitation films have been accused of spreading misinformation about sharks causing inflated fear of the animal, contributing to the worldwide decline of sharks
 Stoner film or Stonersploitation: a subgenre that features the explicit use of marijuana, typically in a comical and positive light. Cheech & Chong collaborations are a good example; a more recent series in this genre is Harold & Kumar. Other movies in this genre include: Pineapple Express, Knocked Up, The Big Lebowski, Half Baked, Dude, Where's My Car?, Jay and Silent Bob Strike Back, Super Troopers, & Get Him to the Greek.
 Swimsploitation: a subgenre of the sports film genre which focuses on water sports. An early example includes Bathing Beauty, the acclaimed documentaries The Endless Summer and Big River Man as well as the cult classic film The Swimmer.
 Teensploitation: the exploitation of teenagers by the producers of teen-oriented films, with plots involving drugs, sex, alcohol and crime. The word teensploitation first appeared in a show business publication in 1982 and was included in Merriam Webster's Collegiate Dictionary for the first time in 2004. River's Edge, inspired by the murder of Marcy Renee Conrad, is a highly acclaimed instance, featuring early performances by Crispin Glover and Keanu Reeves and a cameo appearance by Dennis Hopper. The Larry Clark films Bully, Ken Park and Kids are well-known teensploitation films. American International Pictures made films for the teenage market from the 1950s on. The Pom Pom Girls was the inspiration behind slasher horror films and The Beatniks is a film with "familiar tropes found in straight-up 1950s juvenile delinquency teensploitation." The depictions of American teens, female relationships and free-flowing narrative, topics are featured like dating, sex, hanging out, disobedience, etc., of "Halloween and The Pom Pom Girls became standard elements of the slasher film." Teensploitation films, an era of teen sex comedies from the 80s, featuring gratuitous nudity. Some of the films are: The Last American Virgin, Private Lessons (1981), Animal House (1978), Heaven Help Us (1985), Spring Break (1983), Hot Resort (1985), Porkys, Surf II, Meatballs (1979), Summer Camp (1979), King Frat (1979), Private School (1983), Screwballs (1983), and Loose Screws (1985). The teen-adjacent sexploitation genre was born out of teensploitation, B-movie director Roger Corman was inspired to make many films about sexy teachers, sexy nurses, and many more. The Stewardesses (1969), Swedish Fly Girls (1971), The Swinging Stewardesses (1971), The Swinging Cheerleaders (1974), Fly Me (1973), Flying Acquaintances (1973), Blazing Stewardesses (1975), The Naughty Stewardesses (1974), Stewardess School (1986), The Bikini Carwash Company (1992) and Party Plane (1991). Lesser known: Computer Beach Party and Hamburger: The Motion Picture.
 Turksploitation: Turksploitation is a tongue-in-cheek label given to a great number of unauthorized Turkish film adaptations of popular foreign (particularly Hollywood) movies and television series, produced mainly in the 1970s and 1980s. Filmed on a shoestring budget with often comically simple special effects and no regard for copyright, Turksploitation films substituted exuberant inventiveness and zany plots for technical and acting skill, although noted Turkish actors did feature in some of these productions. Examples of this genre have gained popularity in Turkey, such as Dünyayı Kurtaran Adam ("The Man Who Saved The World"), colloquially "Turkish Star Wars" (1982), which includes footage from Star Wars and music from many sci-fi films; or Ayşecik ve Sihirli Cüceler Rüyalar Ülkesinde ("Little Ayşe and the Magic Dwarves in the Land of Dreams", 1971), based on The Wizard of Oz.
 Vigilante films: films in which a person breaks the law to exact justice. These films were rooted in 1970s unease over government corruption, failure in the Vietnam War, and rising crime rates. They reflect the rising political trend of neoconservatism. The genre is believed to have originated with the 1970 film Joe. The classic example is the Death Wish series, starring Charles Bronson. Vigilante films often deal with individuals who cannot find help within the system, such as the Native American protagonist of Billy Jack, or characters in blaxploitation films such as Coffy, or people from small towns who go to larger cities in pursuit of runaway relatives, as in Hardcore (1979),  Trackdown (1976) and Next of Kin (1989). There are "vigilante cop" movies about policemen who feel thwarted by the legal system, as in the Walking Tall series, Mad Max, and the Dirty Harry series of Clint Eastwood movies. These are not considered to be true vigilante films in the classic sense, because they do not involve ordinary citizens seeking justice for a personal hurt. Similarly, Martin Scorsese's Taxi Driver does not fit the category, because of its mentally disturbed protagonist. 
 Zaxploitation: The exploitation films of South Africa.

See also 

 Aestheticization of violence
 B movie
 Cult film
 Midnight movie
 Video nasty
 Z movie

References

Citations

Sources 

 
 Eric Schaefer (1999). Bold! Daring! Shocking! True!: A History of Exploitation Films, 1919–1959. Duke University Press.
 
 Cathal Tohill and Pete Tombs, Immoral Tales: European Sex & Horror Movies 1956-1984, 1994. .
 V. Vale and Andrea Juno, RE/Search no. 10: Incredibly Strange Films. RE/Search Publications, 1986. .
 Ephraim Katz, The Film Encyclopedia 5e, 2005. .
 Benedikt Eppenberger, Daniel Stapfer. Maedchen, Machos und Moneten: Die unglaubliche Geschichte des Schweizer Kinounternehmers Erwin C. Dietrich. Mit einem Vorwort von Jess Franco. Verlag Scharfe Stiefel, Zurich, 2006, .

External links

 The Grindhouse Cinema Database. International & classic exploitation cinema magazine and encyclopedia.
 "Lights! Camera! Apocalypse!"  Salon article about Rapture films as Christian exploitation filmmaking.
 Paracinema Magazine  – Quarterly film magazine dedicated to B-movies, cult classics, indie, horror, science-fiction, exploitation, underground and Asian films from past and present.
 Boulevard Movies — Exploitation films on DVD & Blu-ray.

 
Film genres
Midnight movie
Obscenity controversies in film